Luna Amară is a Romanian rock band from Cluj-Napoca . The band, which was founded in 1999 under the name Tanagra Noise, consists of Mihnea Blidariu (lead vocals, trumpet, rhythm guitar), Nick Făgădar (lead vocals, rhythm guitar), Sorin Moraru (bass), Răzvan Ristea (drums) and Andrei Boțan (lead guitar). The band's name translates to Bitter Moon, and is borrowed from the Roman Polanski movie of the same name, inspired by the eponymous novel written by Pascal Bruckner. As of 2018, Luna Amară have released six studio albums (Asfalt, Loc Lipsă, Don't Let Your Dreams Fall Asleep, Pietre În Alb, Aproape and Nord).

History
The band was formed by Nick Făgădar (vocals, guitar) and Gheorghe Farcaş (bass guitar) in Cluj-Napoca, Transylvania, in September 1999. The initial name of the band was Tanagra Noise. In 2000 they changed it to the current name, Luna Amară. As a live act, this Romanian five-piece outfit has a style that combines progressive metal with alternative rock. Luna Amara was the first Romanian band to introduce the trumpet sound into the alternative rock style.

The band members try promote and support a modern European society in Romania, and their lyrics often have a political message. Luna Amară is also involved in ecological projects such as "Save Vama Veche" (protecting the endangered seahorses), "Save Roşia Montană"  (protecting the wildlife and natural surroundings of a mountain area from cyanide poisoning) and social awareness projects, such as the "Vote for Them" tour, organized to convince young adults to vote.

Luna Amară is currently one of Romania's most successful groups from the new wave of rock acts. They were the top selling artist in national chain of music stores (Hollywood Music & Film) from July until September 2004. Their singles Folclor, Gri Dorian, Roşu aprins and Ego nr. 4 have reached number one in airplay charts at local radio stations around the country .

In January 2006 they released the album Loc Lipsă. The band performed a 40 dates tour all over Romania in clubs and open air locations as well as shows in the Netherlands, Germany, Bulgaria and Turkey. For the 2nd time consecutively, Luna Amară has been invited to play live at Sziget Festival in Budapest.

After two very well-sold albums, in 2009 Luna Amară has recorded a third one, "Don't Let Your Dreams Fall Asleep", where the acoustic side of the band is especially underlined. This album contains nine songs in English and three in Romanian. "Don't Let Your Dreams Fall Asleep" was praised in such cultural magazines as Dilema Veche and some of their singles, such as "Chihlimbar", remained number one on several charts for quite a long time, such as for 4 weeks in June and July 2009 in Cityfm'''s Romtop.

Band members

Current members
 Mihnea Blidariu – lead vocals, trumpet, rhythm guitar
 Nick Făgădar – lead vocals, rhythm guitar
 Sorin Moraru – bass 
 Răzvan Ristea – drums
 Andrei Boțan – lead guitar

Former members
 Șerban-Onțanu Crăciun - lead guitar
Mihnea Andrei Ferezan - lead guitar
 Vali Deac - lead guitar
 Petru Gavrila - lead guitar
 Gheorghe Farcaș - bass guitar

Discography

Studio albums
 Asfalt (2004)
 1.Gri Dorian,2.Oras,3.Asfalt,4.Ego Nr.4, 5.Rosu Aprins,6.Your Garden,7.Mara(acoustic),8.Dizident,9.Antidot,10.Folclor,11.Simplify My Spider,12.Stare De Gratie,13.Tanagra,14.Unfed,15.Ciudat(acoustic)
 Loc Lipsă(2006)
1.Loc Lipsa,2.Intunecare,3.Se intampla-n Romania,4.Albastru,5.Luni de Fiere,6.La Vedere,7.Lume Oarba,8.Downtown Jesus
9.Umbra Copil,10.Somn,11.Din Cercuri,12.In Cercuri,13.Cui si Spin,14.Happines Provider,15.Din Valuri Ard.
 Don't Let Your Dreams Fall Asleep (2008)
1.Into Another,2.Transitions,3.Chihlimbar,4.Unghii De Drac,5.True Sunshine,6.Deadends,7.No Return,8.Kill The Dancer
9.Hunt The Wire,10.Floodmoses,11.Little Sun,12.Mara 2008.
 Pietre în Alb (2011)
1.In Gol,2.Bathtub Glory,3.Versus,4.Cand Totul a Murit Tacut,5.In Tine Tu,6.In Lumina,7.Doar Gandul,8.Pietre In Alb,9.Are We Happy Now,10.Glow
11.Monkey Retail,12.Oameni Noi,13.Toti La Fel.
 Aproape (2016)
1.Aproape,2.Doar Noi Doi,3.Dusi De Val,4.Lampioane,5.Pene,6.Prea Tarziu,7.Prieteni Calatori.
 Nord'' (2018)
1.Atat De Simplu,2.Insomnii,3.Viu,4.Nu Stiu,Nu Iau,Nu Sunt,5.Alearga,Asteapta, 6.Ploi Negre,
7.Om,8.Respira Un Inceput,9.Focuri,10.Tacerea,11.Esti Tu.

References

External links 
  Interview with Mihnea Blidariu (voice, guitar & trumpet)

Romanian alternative rock groups
Romanian heavy metal musical groups